Michale Spicer (born June 30, 1982) is an American football defensive end who is currently a free agent. He was signed by the Buffalo Bills as an undrafted free agent in 2004. He played college football at Western Carolina. He is now an assistant coach at Pomona-Pitzer.

Save has also been a member of the Los Angeles Avengers, Columbus Destroyers, New Orleans VooDoo, New York Sentinels and Hartford Colonials.

External links

Arena Football League bio
Western Carolina Catamounts bio

1982 births
Living people
People from El Paso, Texas
People from Wayne County, North Carolina
Players of American football from Texas
Players of American football from North Carolina
American football defensive ends
American football linebackers
Western Carolina Catamounts football players
Buffalo Bills players
Los Angeles Avengers players
Columbus Destroyers players
New Orleans VooDoo players
New York Sentinels players
Hartford Colonials players
Arizona Rattlers players
Los Angeles Kiss players